Ben McNamara (born 8 December 2001) is a professional rugby league footballer who plays as a  and  for Hull FC in the Super League.

Background
McNamara is the son of coach Steve McNamara. He played rugby union and amateur rugby league for the Skirlaugh Bulls.

Career

2020
McNamara made his Super League debut in round 14 of the 2020 Super League season for Hull against the Castleford Tigers and went on to score a try in the 61st minute.

References

External links
Hull FC profile

2001 births
Living people
English rugby league players
Hull F.C. players
Rugby league halfbacks
Rugby league players from Kingston upon Hull